Majorie Homer-Dixon (born August 10, 1945) is a Canadian sprint kayaker who competed in the late 1960s and early 1970s. Competing in two Summer Olympics, she was eliminated in the semifinals of all three events in which she competed (1968: K-1 500 m, 1972: K-1 500 m, K-2 500 m). She was born in Indochina.

References
Sports-reference.com profile

1945 births
Canadian female canoeists
Canoeists at the 1968 Summer Olympics
Canoeists at the 1972 Summer Olympics
Living people
Olympic canoeists of Canada